Thomas Hacker (born 9 October 1967) is a German tax consultant and politician of the Free Democratic Party (FDP) who has been serving as a member of the Bundestag from the state of Bavaria since 2017.

Early life and career 
Hacker was born in Bayreuth. After high school graduation and military service, he completed an apprenticeship as a bank clerk and then studied business administration at the University of Bayreuth, majoring in business taxation, finance and banking management. 

From 2002 to 2016 Hacker was a partner in an auditing and tax consultancy firm based in Kulmbach.

Political career

Career in state politics 
Since 1995 Hacker has been a member of the FDP. From 2008 until 2013, he served as a member of the Landtag of Bavaria. During that period, he chaired the FDP parliamentary group.

Member of the German Parliament, 2017–present 
Hacker has been a member of the German Bundestag since the 2017 elections, representing Bayreuth. In parliament, he is a member of the Committee on European Affairs and the Committee on Cultural Affairs and Media. He also serves as his parliamentary group's spokesman on media policy.

In the negotiations to form a so-called traffic light coalition of the Social Democratic Party (SPD), the Green Party and the FDP following the 2021 federal elections, Hacker was part of his party's delegation in the working group on cultural affairs and media policy, co-chaired by Carsten Brosda, Claudia Roth and Otto Fricke.

Other activities 
 Memorial to the Murdered Jews of Europe Foundation, Member of the Board of Trustees (since 2022) 
 Federal Foundation for the Reappraisal of the SED Dictatorship, Alternate Member of the Board of Trustees (since 2022)
 Stasi Records Agency, Member of the Advisory Board
 Thomas Dehler Foundation (since 2011)

References

External links 

 Bundestag biography 

1967 births
Living people
Members of the Bundestag for Bavaria
Members of the Bundestag 2021–2025
Members of the Bundestag 2017–2021
Members of the Bundestag for the Free Democratic Party (Germany)
University of Bayreuth alumni
People from Bayreuth